Raymond Masono (died on 25 June 2021) was a politician from Autonomous Region of Bougainville. He was the Vice-President of the Autonomous Region of Bougainville from 2017 to 2020.

Biography
Masono was elected as a member of the Bougainville House of Representatives from Atolls in 2015. Later, he was appointed as Minister for Mineral and Energy Resources.

Masono was elected as Vice-President of the Autonomous Region of Bougainville in 2017.

On 2 October 2020 Masono was appointed Minister of Health in the cabinet of Ishmael Toroama.

Masono died on 25 June 2021 at the hospital in Buka.

References

20th-century births
2021 deaths
Vice-presidents of the Autonomous Region of Bougainville
Members of the Bougainville House of Representatives
Year of birth missing
Government ministers of the Autonomous Region of Bougainville
21st-century Papua New Guinean politicians